1993 Emmy Awards may refer to:

 45th Primetime Emmy Awards, the 1993 Emmy Awards ceremony honoring primetime programming
 20th Daytime Emmy Awards, the 1993 Emmy Awards ceremony honoring daytime programming
 21st International Emmy Awards, the 1993 Emmy Awards ceremony honoring international programming

Emmy Award ceremonies by year